Hakamaii is an associated commune on the island of Ua Pou in the Marquesas Islands group of French Polynesia. Its population was 530 at the 2017 census.

References

Populated places in the Marquesas Islands